Shalders is a surname of English origin. People with the name include:

 Richard Shalders (born 1938), Australian politician
 Richard Barcham Shalders (1824–1914), New Zealand Baptist preacher
 Russ Shalders (born 1951), Royal Australian Navy officer
 Steven Shalders (born 1981), Welsh athlete
 William Shalders (1880–1917), South African cricketer

English-language surnames